The Vendidad /ˈvendi'dæd/ or Videvdat or Videvdad is a collection of texts within the greater compendium of the Avesta. However, unlike the other texts of the Avesta, the Vendidad is an ecclesiastical code, not a liturgical manual.

Name
The name of the texts is a contraction of the Avestan language Vî-Daêvô-Dāta, "Given Against the Daevas (Demons)", and as the name suggests, the Vendidad is an enumeration of various manifestations of evil spirits, and ways to confound them. According to the divisions of the Avesta as described in the Denkard, a 9th-century text, the Vendidad includes all of the 19th nask, which is then the only nask that has survived in its entirety.

Content
The Vendidad's different parts vary widely in character and in age. Although some portions are relatively recent in origin, the subject matter of the greater part is very old. In 1877, Karl Friedrich Geldner identified the texts as being linguistically distinct from both the Old Avestan language texts as well as from the Yashts of the younger Avesta. 
Today, there is controversy over historical development of the Vendidad. The Vendidad is classified by some as an artificial, young Avestan text. Its language resembles Old Avestan. The Vendidad is thought to be a Magi (Magi-influenced) composition. It has also been suggested that the Vendidad belongs to a particular school, but "no linguistic or textual argument allows us to attain any degree of certainty in these matters."

The Vendidad consists of 22 fargards containing fragments of discussions between Ahura Mazda and Zoroaster. The arrangement does not suggest it was composed by the prophet's contemporaries.

However, some consider the Vendidad a link to ancient early oral traditions, later written as a book of laws for the Zoroastrian community.
 The writing of the Vendidad began - perhaps substantially - before the formation of the Median and Persian Empires, before the 8th century B.C.E..

In addition, as with the Yashts, the date of composition of the final version does not exclude the possibility that some parts of the Vendidad may consist of very old material. Even in this modern age, Zoroastrians are continually rewriting old spiritual material.

The first chapter is dualistic creation myth, followed by the description of a destructive winter. The second chapter recounts the legend of Yima (Jamshid). Chapter 19 relates the temptation of Zoroaster, who, when urged by Angra Mainyu to turn from the good religion, turns instead towards Ahura Mazda. The remaining chapters cover diverse rules and regulations, through the adherence of which evil spirits may be confounded. Broken down by subject, these fargards deal with the following topics (chapters where a topic is covered are in brackets):

 hygiene (in particular care of the dead) [3, 5, 6, 7, 8, 16, 17, 19] and cleansing [9,10];
 disease, its origin, and spells against it [7, 10, 11, 13, 20, 21, 22];
 mourning for the dead [12], the Towers of Silence [6], and the remuneration of deeds after death [19];
 the sanctity of, and invocations to, Atar (fire) [8], Zam (earth) [3,6], Apas (water) [6, 8, 21] and the light of the stars [21];
 the dignity of wealth and charity [4], of marriage [4, 15] and of physical effort [4]
 statutes on unacceptable social behaviour [15] such as breach of contract [4] and assault [4];
 on the worthiness of priests [18];
 praise and care of the bull [21], the dog [13, 15], the otter [14], the Sraosha bird [18], and the Haoma tree [6].

There is a degree of moral relativism apparent in the Vendidad, and the diverse rules and regulations are not always expressed as being mystical, absolute, universal or mandatory. The Vendidad is mainly about social laws, mores, customs and culture. In some instances, the description of prescribed behaviour is accompanied by a description of the penances that have to be made to atone for violations thereof. Such penances include:
 payment in cash or kind to the aggrieved;
 corporal punishment such as whipping;
 repeated recitations of certain parts of the liturgy such as the Ahuna Vairya invocation.

Value of the Vendidad among Zoroastrians 
Most of the Zoroastrians continue to use the Vendidad as a valued and fundamental cultural and ethical moral guide, viewing their teachings as essential to Zoroastrian tradition  and see it as part of Zoroastrianism original perspectives about the truth of spiritual existence. They argue that it has origins on early oral tradition, being only later written.

The emergent reformist Zoroastrian movement reject the later writings in the Avesta as being corruptions of Zarathustra's original teachings and thus do not consider the Vendidad as an original Zoroastrian scripture. They argue that it was written nearly 700 years after the death of Zarathustra and interpret the writing as different from the other parts of the Avesta.

An article by Hannah M. G. Shapero sums up the reformist perspective:

"How do Zoroastrians view the Vendidad today? And how many of the laws of the Vendidad are still followed? This depends, as so many other Zoroastrian beliefs and practices do, on whether you are a "reformist" or a "traditionalist." The reformists, following the Gathas as their prime guide, judge the Vendidad harshly as being a deviation from the non-prescriptive, abstract teachings of the Gathas. For them, few if any of the laws or practices in the Vendidad are either in the spirit or the letter of the Gathas, and so they are not to be followed. The reformists prefer to regard the Vendidad as a document which has no religious value but is only of historic or anthropological interest. Many Zoroastrians, in Iran, India, and the world diaspora, inspired by reformists, have chosen to dispense with the Vendidad prescriptions entirely or only to follow those which they believe are not against the original spirit of the Gathas."

Liturgical use
Although the Vendidad is not a liturgical manual, a section of it may be recited as part of a greater Yasna service. Although such extended Yasnas appears to have been frequently performed in the mid-18th century (as noted in Anquetil-Duperron's observations), it is very rarely performed at the present day. In such an extended service, Visparad 12 and Vendidad 1-4 are inserted between Yasna 27 and 28. The Vendidad ceremony is always performed between nightfall and dawn, though a normal Yasna is performed between dawn and noon.

Because of its length and complexity, the Vendidad is read, rather than recalled from memory as is otherwise necessary for the Yasna texts. The recitation of the Vendidad requires a priest of higher rank (one with a moti khub) than is normally necessary for the recitation of the Yasna.

The Vendidad should not be confused with the Vendidad Sadé. The latter is the name for a set of manuscripts of the Yasna texts into which the Vendidad and Visperad have been interleaved. These manuscripts were used for liturgical purposes outside the yasna ceremony proper, not accompanied by any ritual activity. The expression sadé, "clean", was used to indicate that these texts were not accompanied by commentaries in Middle Persian.

See also
Avesta
Avestan geography

Notes

External links

 

Zoroastrian texts
Avesta